Noah Arinzechukwu Okafor (born 24 May 2000) is a Swiss professional footballer who plays as striker for Austrian Bundesliga club Red Bull Salzburg and the Switzerland national team.

Club career

FC Basel
Okafor played his first youth football with local team FC Arisdorf. In 2009 he moved to the youth of FC Basel and continued through all the stages of their youth academy. He advanced to their first team during their 2018–19 season and on 31 January 2018, Okafor signed his first professional contract with his club under head coach Raphaël Wicky. He played his debut for their first team on 19 May 2018 in the home game against FC Luzern. The trainer substituted him in for the injured Mohamed Elyounoussi in the 34th minute and the game ended in a 2–2 draw. He scored his first goal for his club in the second round of the 2018–19 season on 28 July 2018 in the 1–1 away draw against Xamax.

Under trainer Marcel Koller Basel won the Swiss Cup in the 2018–19 season. In the first round Basel beat FC Montlingen 3–0, in the second round Echallens Région 7–2 and in the round of 16 Winterthur 1–0. In the quarter finals Sion were defeated 4–2 after extra time and in the semi finals Zürich were defeated 3–1. All these games were played away from home. The final was held on 19 May 2019 in the Stade de Suisse Wankdorf Bern against Thun. Striker Albian Ajeti scored the first goal, Fabian Frei the second for Basel, then Dejan Sorgić netted a goal for Thun, but the end result was 2–1 for Basel. Okafor played in four cup games and scored a goal in the semi-final against Zürich.

Between the years 2017 and 2020 Okafor played a total of 72 games for Basel scoring a total of nine goals. 39 of these games were in the Swiss Super League, seven in the Swiss Cup, eight in the UEFA competitions (Champios League and Europa League) and 18 were friendly games. He scored three goals in the domestic league, two in the cup, two in the European competitions and the other two were scored during the test games.

Red Bull Salzburg
On 31 January 2020, Okafor signed for Red Bull Salzburg.

On 8 December 2021, Okafor scored the only goal of the game as Salzburg defeated Sevilla in the final group stage match of the Champions League. The win meant Salzburg secured progression to the Round of 16 and became the first-ever Austrian club to qualify for the knockout stages of the Champions League.

International career
Okafor played various international games for the Swiss U-15 and U-17 teams. He played his first game for the U-18 team on 9 May 2018 in the 1–1 draw against the Italian U-18 team.

He made his debut for the senior national team debut on 9 June 2019 in the 2019 UEFA Nations League third place game against England, as an 113th-minute substitute for Haris Seferovic.
Okafor scored his first international goal for Switzerland on 15 November 2021, in their World Cup qualifying game against Bulgaria, a win which secured automatic qualification for Switzerland to the 2022 FIFA World Cup.

Personal life
Born in Binningen, Switzerland, Okafor is of Igbo descent. His father is from Nigeria and his mother is Swiss.

Career statistics

Club

International

Scores and results list Switzerland's goal tally first, score column indicates score after each Okafor goal.

Honours 
Basel
Swiss Cup: 2018–19

Red Bull Salzburg
Austrian Bundesliga: 2019–20, 2020–21, 2021–22
Austrian Cup: 2019–20, 2020–21, 2021–22

References

External links

2000 births
Sportspeople from Basel-Landschaft
Living people
Swiss men's footballers
Swiss people of Nigerian descent
Association football midfielders
Switzerland international footballers
Switzerland youth international footballers
Swiss Super League players
Austrian Football Bundesliga players
FC Basel players
FC Red Bull Salzburg players
2022 FIFA World Cup players
Swiss expatriate footballers
Expatriate footballers in Austria
Igbo sportspeople
Swiss expatriate sportspeople in Austria